Velothon Wales was a single-day road bicycle race held between 2015 and 2017 in Wales, United Kingdom. It was part of the UCI Europe Tour as a 1.1 race. It was part of the UCI Velothon Majors series of races organised by Lagardère Unlimited, which also includes Velothon Berlin, Velothon Stockholm and Velothon Vienna. These events are characterised by mass-participation sportives before an elite race along a lengthened route. No professional race was held as part of its 2018 edition, with the event folding after this edition.

Winners

References

External links
 

UCI Europe Tour races
Cycle races in Wales
Recurring sporting events established in 2015
2015 establishments in Wales
Recurring sporting events disestablished in 2018
2018 disestablishments in Wales